Ambesa dentifera is a species of snout moth that is endemic to California.

References

Moths described in 2003
Endemic fauna of California
Pyralinae
Moths of North America
Fauna without expected TNC conservation status